Rogersville is an unincorporated community in Benton County, Iowa, United States.

History
A post office was established in Rogersville (also spelled Rogerville) in 1893, and remained in operation until it was discontinued in 1897. Rogerville's population was 26 in 1902.

References

Unincorporated communities in Benton County, Iowa
1893 establishments in Iowa
Unincorporated communities in Iowa